Peggy Crowe (January 15, 1956 – February 9, 2012) was an American speed skater. She competed at the 1976 Winter Olympics.

References

External links
 

1956 births
2012 deaths
American female speed skaters
Olympic speed skaters of the United States
Speed skaters at the 1976 Winter Olympics
Sportspeople from St. Louis
21st-century American women